The taxonomy of the Procellariidae, or procellariids, is complex and still a matter of some debate. The traditional taxonomy breaks the procellariids into four main groups, the fulmarine petrels, the prions, the gadfly petrels and the shearwaters. Recent studies have called this arrangement into question.



Traditional taxonomy
This traditional taxonomy is based upon Carboneras (1992) in the Handbook of the Birds of the World.

Fulmarine petrels
Macronectes
Fulmarus
Thalassoica
Daption
Pagodroma
Gadfly petrels
Pterodroma
Prions
Halobaena
Pachyptila
Shearwaters
Procellaria
Calonectris
Puffinus

Revised taxonomy
Based on Austin (1996), Bretagnolle et al. (1998), Nunn & Stanley (1998) and Brooke (2004), several changes have been made from the more traditional taxonomy. The two species in the genus Bulweria are no longer considered close to the rest of the gadfly petrels; several more gadfly petrels are removed from Pterodroma and placed in Pseudobulweria (allied to the shearwaters), and the Kerguelen petrel is also removed from Pterodroma and placed in the monotypic Lugensa. Several taxa are also elevated to species status on the basis of newer studies.

Fulmarine petrels
 Macronectes
 Macronectes halli, northern giant petrel
 Macronectes giganteus, southern giant petrel
 Fulmarus
 Fulmarus glacialis, northern fulmar
 Fulmarus glacialoides, southern fulmar
 Thalassoica
 Thalassoica antarctica, Antarctic petrel
 Daption
 Daption capense, Cape petrel
 Pagodroma
 Pagodroma nivea, snow petrel

Prions
Pelecanoides
Pelecanoides garnotii, Peruvian diving-petrel
Pelecanoides magellani, Magellanic diving-petrel
Pelecanoides georgicus, South Georgia diving-petrel
Pelecanoides urinatrix, common diving-petrel
 Halobaena
 Halobaena caerula, blue petrel
 Pachyptila
 Pachyptila turtur, fairy prion
 Pachyptila belcheri, slender-billed prion
 Pachyptila crassirostris, fulmar prion
 Pachyptila vittata, broad-billed prion
 Pachyptila desolata, Antarctic prion
 Pachyptila salvin, Salvin's prion

Procellarine petrels
 Procellaria
 Procellaria aequinoctialis, white-chinned petrel
 Procellaria conspicillata, spectacled petrel
 Procellaria westlandica, Westland petrel
 Procellaria parkinsoni, black petrel
 Procellaria cinerea, grey petrel
 Bulweria
 Bulweria bulwerii, Bulwer's petrel
 Bulweria fallax, Jouanin's petrel
 †Bulweria bifax, small Saint Helena petrel (extinct)

Shearwaters
 Calonectris
 Calonectris borealis, Cory's shearwater
 Calonectris diomedea, Scopoli's shearwater
 Calonectris edwardsii, Cape Verde shearwater
 Calonectris leucomelas, streaked shearwater
 Puffinus
 (Sub)Genus Puffinus ("Puffinus" group) - smaller species, closely related to Calonectris
 Puffinus nativatis, Christmas shearwater
 Puffinus subalaris, Galápagos shearwater
 Puffinus gavia, fluttering shearwater
 Puffinus huttoni, Hutton's shearwater
 Puffinus yelkouan, yelkouan shearwater
 Puffinus mauretanicus, Balearic shearwater
 Puffinus assimilis, little shearwater
 Puffinus heinrothi, Heinroth's shearwater
 Puffinus lherminieri, Audubon's shearwater
 Puffinus (lherminieri) baroli, North Atlantic little shearwater
 Puffinus (lherminieri) persicus, Persian shearwater
 Puffinus (lherminieri) bailloni, tropical shearwater or Baillon's shearwater
 Puffinus (lherminieri) bannermani, Bannerman's shearwater
 Puffinus puffinus, Manx shearwater
 Puffinus opisthomelas, black-vented shearwater
 Puffinus auricularis, Townsend's shearwater
 Puffinus newelli, Hawaiian shearwater
 †Puffinus parvus, Bermuda shearwater (extinct)

 (Sub)Genus Ardenna ("Neonectris" group) - larger species, a distinct lineage
 Puffinus creatopus, pink-footed shearwater
 Puffinus carneipes, flesh-footed shearwater
 Puffinus gravis, great shearwater
 Puffinus griseus, sooty shearwater
 Puffinus tenuirostris, short-tailed shearwater
 Puffinus pacificus, wedge-tailed shearwater
 Puffinus bulleri, Buller's shearwater
 Pseudobulweria
 Puffinus macgillivrayi, Fiji petrel
 Puffinus rostrata, Tahiti petrel
 Puffinus becki, Beck's petrel
 Puffinus aterrima, Mascarene petrel
 †Puffinus rupinarus, large Saint Helena petrel (extinct)
 Aphrodroma
 Aphrodroma brevirostris, Kerguelen petrel

Gadfly petrels
 Pterodroma
 Pterodroma baraui, Barau's petrel
 Pterodroma arminjoniana, Trindade petrel
 Pterodroma (arminjoniana) heraldica, herald petrel
 Pterodroma externa, Juan Fernandez petrel
 Pterodroma neglecta, Kermadec petrel
 Pterodroma phaeopygia, Galapagos petrel
 Pterodroma sandwichensis, Hawaiian petrel
 Pterodroma atrata, Henderson petrel
 Pterodroma alba, Phoenix petrel
 Pterodroma feae, Fea's petrel
 Pterodroma madeira, Zino's petrel or Madeira petrel
 Pterodroma mollis, soft-plumaged petrel
 Pterodroma cahow, Bermuda petrel
 Pterodroma hasitata, black-capped petrel
 †Pterodroma caribbaea, Jamaica petrel (probably extinct)
 Pterodroma incerta, Atlantic petrel
 Pterodroma lessonii, white-headed petrel
 Pterodroma magentae, magenta petrel
 Pterodroma macroptera, great-winged petrel
 Pterodroma solandri, providence petrel
 Pterodroma ultima, Murphy's petrel
 Pterodroma inexpectata, mottled petrel
 Pterodroma pycrofti, Pycroft's petrel
 Pterodroma longirostris, Stejneger's petrel
 Pterodroma brevipes, collared petrel
 Pterodroma leucoptera, Gould's petrel
 †Pterodroma cf. leucoptera, Mangareva petrel (possibly extinct)
 Pterodroma cookii, Cook's petrel
 Pterodroma defilippiana, Masatierra petrel
 Pterodroma hypoleuca, Bonin petrel
 Pterodroma cervicalis, white-necked petrel
 Pterodroma occulta, Vanuatu petrel
 Pterodroma nigripennis, black-winged petrel
 Pterodroma axillaris, Chatham petrel

An undescribed prehistorically extinct species was found on Easter Island. For other non-Recent extinctions, see the genus accounts.

References

 Austin, Jeremy J. (1996): Molecular Phylogenetics of Puffinus Shearwaters: Preliminary Evidence from Mitochondrial Cytochrome b Gene Sequences. Molecular Phylogenetics and Evolution 6(1): 77–88  (HTML abstract)
 Bretagnolle, V., Attié, C., Pasquet, E., (1998): Cytochrome-b evidence for validity and phylogenetic relationships of Pseudobulweria and Bulweria (Procellariidae). Auk 115(1):188-195 PDf fulltext
 Brooke, M. (2004): Albatrosses and Petrels Across the World. Oxford University Press, Oxford, UK. 
 Carboneras, C. (1992): Family Procellariidae (Petrels and Shearwaters). In: Handbook of Birds of the World 1. Lynx Edicions, Barcelona. 
 Imber, M.J. (1985): Origins, phylogeny and taxonomy of the gadfly petrels Pterodroma spp.. Ibis 127: 197–229.
 Nunn, Gary B. & Stanley, Scott E. (1998): Body Size Effects and Rates of Cytochrome b Evolution in Tube-Nosed Seabirds. Molecular Biology and Evolution 15: 1360–1371. PDF fulltext Corrigendum

Lists of birds
Procellariidae